Stefano Tacconi  (born 13 May 1957) is an Italian former professional footballer who played as a goalkeeper. He is the only goalkeeper to have won all international club competitions, a feat he managed during his time with Juventus. At international level, he was largely used as a back-up goalkeeper behind Walter Zenga, which earned him the nickname "the best back-up keeper in the world". He was a member of the Italy squads that took part at the 1988 Summer Olympics, UEFA Euro 1988, and the 1990 FIFA World Cup. He is widely regarded by pundits as one of the best goalkeepers of his generation, and as one of Italy's best ever goalkeepers.

Club career
Tacconi got his first significant experience at Spoleto football club. Following this, having already attracted the interest of Inter Milan, he had his first brief stint as a professional with Pro Patria and Livorno before joining Sambenedettese. He then reached Serie A with Avellino in the 1980–81 season; he remained there for three years before joining the Italian club Juventus in 1983, ahead of Luciano Bodini, as a replacement for his legendary predecessor Dino Zoff, who had retired at the end of the previous season.

With Giovanni Trapattoni's Juventus club, Tacconi achieved great domestic and international success, as he won two scudetti in 1984 and 1986, the European Cup Winners' Cup in 1984, the 1984 European Super Cup, the European Champion Clubs' Cup in 1985 and the 1985 Intercontinental Cup the same year against Argentinos Juniors on penalties. In 1990 Tacconi and Juventus went on to win a UEFA Cup and a Coppa Italia double; the following season, he was named the team's captain, although Juventus lost out on the 1990 Supercoppa Italiana to Serie A winners Napoli. During this period, Juventus were one of the best teams in the world, and Tacconi was also regarded as one of the top goalkeepers in the world.

After a ten-year working relationship with Juventus (during the 1985–86 season he was kept on the bench), Tacconi transferred to Genoa C.F.C. in 1992. Unfortunately, Genoa was relegated to Serie B at the end of season. He retired from professional football in 1994.

International career
Despite his performances and success with Juventus, Tacconi was not able to find much space in the Italian national side under Azeglio Vicini, due to the presence of several other excellent keepers, such as Giovanni Galli initially, and Walter Zenga – his perceived career rival – in particular, as well as the emerging keeper Gianluca Pagliuca, subsequently. As a result, Tacconi was frequently Zenga's reserve for the Italian national team.

Tacconi made his senior international debut in a 3–1 win over Argentina on 10 June 1987, in Zürich. In the late 1980s, he was chosen by manager and former goalkeeper Dino Zoff as the starting goalkeeper for the Under-23 Italian Olympic side which reached the semi-finals in the 1988 Olympics in Seoul, eventually finishing in fourth place. Tacconi was Zenga's deputy during Euro 1988, where Italy managed a semi-final finish, and at the 1990 World Cup on home soil, where Italy finished in third place following a semi-final loss on penalties to defending champions Argentina. In total, Tacconi made seven appearances for Italy between 1987 and 1991, all in friendly matches, conceding two goals. He played his final match for Italy on 13 February 1991, keeping a clean sheet in a 0–0 friendly home draw with Belgium, in Terni.

Style of play
Although not particularly agile, Tacconi was a powerful and athletic goalkeeper, who was known for his consistency and shot-stopping ability, as well as his ability to produce important saves, in particular in decisive games. A vocal and commanding presence in goal, he was also known for his leadership, temper, and strong character, and often called out defenders for their errors. Although he was initially not known for his ability to come out and collect crosses, and performed better between the posts, he improved upon this aspect of his game in his later career, with the help of Zoff, and often came off his line to claim high balls that were coming straight at him, although he still remained less inclined to collect deliveries from wider areas. He was also known for his adeptness at stopping penalties. Although he had a deep goal kick, he was not particularly gifted with his feet, and struggled to adapt his game following the introduction of the back-pass rule, and was even critical of the new regulations. He was also not particularly adept at playing as a sweeper-keeper in zonal marking systems.

After retiring from football
After quitting professional football, Tacconi had several disappointing experiences in politics. In 1999, he was on Alleanza Nazionale's lists for the European parliamentary elections, but failed to earn a seat. In 2005, he controversially tried to stand for president of Lombardy as a candidate for New Italian Social Movement, an extreme right-wing party, but could not garner enough votes to validate his candidacy. In 2006, he put in for a city councilman position in Milan again within Alleanza Nazionale, supporting winner Letizia Moratti for mayor, but gained only 57 personal preferences (votes) and was not elected to the office.

In August 2008, at the age of 51, he accepted an offer from FC Arquata, a Seconda Categoria amateur club based in Arquata del Tronto, Marche, to make a return into active football as a goalkeeper.

Personal life
On 13 May 2011, Tacconi married long-time partner Laura Speranza, with whom he has four children.

Honours
Juventus
Serie A: 1983–84, 1985–86
Coppa Italia: 1989–90
European Cup: 1984–85
European Cup Winners' Cup: 1983–84
UEFA Cup: 1989–90
European Super Cup: 1984
Intercontinental Cup: 1985
Supercoppa Italiana: runner-up 1990

Italy
FIFA World Cup: third place 1990

Individual
Premio Nazionale Carriera Esemplare "Gaetano Scirea": 1993

Orders
 5th Class / Knight: Cavaliere Ordine al Merito della Repubblica Italiana: 1991

See also
 List of players to have won all international club competitions
 List of players to have won the three main European club competitions

References

1957 births
Living people
Italian footballers
Italy international footballers
Olympic footballers of Italy
Footballers at the 1988 Summer Olympics
UEFA Euro 1988 players
1990 FIFA World Cup players
Association football goalkeepers
Inter Milan players
Aurora Pro Patria 1919 players
U.S. Livorno 1915 players
A.S. Sambenedettese players
U.S. Avellino 1912 players
Juventus F.C. players
Genoa C.F.C. players
Serie A players
Serie B players
Serie C players
Serie D players
Italian beach soccer players
Sportspeople from Perugia
Footballers from Umbria
UEFA Cup winning players
Knights of the Order of Merit of the Italian Republic